The 2016 Hawaii Bowl was a post-season American college football bowl game  played on December 24, 2016, at Aloha Stadium in Honolulu, Hawaii.  The fifteenth edition of the Hawaii Bowl featured the Hawaii Rainbow Warriors from the Mountain West Conference against the Middle Tennessee Blue Raiders from Conference USA.  It began at 3:15 p.m. HST and aired on ESPN.  It was one of the 2016–17 bowl games that concluded the 2016 FBS football season.

Teams 
The game featured the Hawaii Rainbow Warriors with a record of 6–7 against the Middle Tennessee. This was the second time that the Hawaii Bowl featured a team with a losing record, after Fresno State in the 2014 Hawaii Bowl.

This was the second meeting between the schools; the first meeting was on September 5, 1993, where the Rainbow Warriors defeated the Blue Raiders by a score of 35–14.

Hawaii Rainbow Warriors 

Hawaii, playing in their first bowl game since 2010, was the first Hawaii team to enter a bowl game with a losing record. The Rainbow Warriors, led by head coach Nick Rolovich, won the most league games since joining the MW in 2012, and had the most wins in a season since 2011. The Bows had lost three straight bowl games, including the 2008 BCS Sugar Bowl against Georgia,  and had not won since a 41–24 Hawaii Bowl win over Arizona State in 2006, 10 years earlier.

Middle Tennessee Blue Raiders 

Coached by Rick Stockstill, the Blue Raiders were bowl eligible for the sixth time since Stockstill took over in 2006, but MTSU hasn't won a bowl game since 2009, losing four straight bowl games in that span. The Blue Raiders also boasted the 12th best passing offense in the country, scoring 40.5 points a game.

Game summary 
Hawaii won their first bowl game since the 2006 Hawaii Bowl, exactly 10 years prior.

Scoring Summary

Statistics

References 

2016–17 NCAA football bowl games
2016
2016 Hawaii Bowl
2016 Hawaii Bowl
2016 in sports in Hawaii
December 2016 sports events in the United States